The Makhosh were one of the Circassian tribes. The tribe was mostly annihilated in the Circassian genocide following the Russo-Circassian War. A single family remains and lives mostly in the Circassian diaspora.

Many groups of Makhosh were exiled to Ottoman lands, especially in the years 1858-1859, as documented in the Ottoman Archives. They live mostly in Samsun.

Records 
1823: "Mukhoshi, mahash, mukhoshevtsy, at the foot of the Black Mountains. They own rivers from east to west " - Semyon Bogdanovich Bronevsky

1837 "The possession of Mekhhosh. This small possession is located to the west of the Beisleians along the rivers: Farz, Psfr and Kkell. The princely family owned and named Bogarsukovs, is not divided into branches. Bayzrokko, the current prince who leads the Mehkhosh people, is regarded as one of the excellent princes and warriors of the Circassian. Prince Yakhbokqo who preceded him, was killed in a fight with the Abadzekhs, and was the subject of a surprise to the Circassians in courage and intelligence. " - Sultan Khan-Girey

1839 "Mohosh, obeys the princes Bogorsuk. The Mokhoshevsky settlements are located on the left bank of the Laba, higher than the Yegerukaevsky residents. The Mokhoshevites have 1270 male souls. " - Fedor Fedorovich Tornau

1857 "Mohosh. The lands they occupy are irrigated by the Chehuraj, Belogiak and Shede streams. " - Leonty Yakovlevich Lyulie

1913 "Makhosh occupied a triangle, the sharp apex of which was at the confluence of the border marked above and the river. Laba, the same border and Laba served as legs, and the base was the border from the Abadzekhs, from Fars to the east to the river. Labe, north of the present Kostroma stanitsa and south of Zassovskaya. Makhosh, according to N. Kamenev, like the Yegeruqwai, separated from the Chemguy after the death of their common prince Bezruko Bolotokov. Earlier the Chemguy, the Yegeruqwai, and the Makhosh constituted one tribe of the Chemguy, or "kemgoy". " - Fedor Andreevich Shcherbina

Literature 
According to Ronald Wixman, the Makhosh lived between the middle Laba and Belaya River in the northwestern portion of the Caucasus. They were originally one of the ten major tribal divisions of the Adyghe people, each of which was previously considered a distinct set of people.

Toponym 
The ancient toponym - the name of the mountain "Makhoshkushkha" (near Maikop, near which the Petroglyphs of Mahoshkushkha were found) is associated with the Makhoshevites.

Popular culture 
A World of Warcraft character is called Makhosh.

References 

Circassian tribes
History of Samsun Province
History of Kuban
Ethnic groups in Russia
Adygea